Garten is a populated island in the municipality of Ørland in Trøndelag county, Norway. The island is located on the north side of the mouth of the Trondheimsfjorden, just southwest of the mainland. The main population center on the island is also referred to as the village of Garten. 

There is a bridge to the mainland as well as car ferry connections to the nearby island of Storfosna (also in Ørland municipality) and also to the island of Leksa (in neighboring Agdenes municipality) and to the mainland of Agdenes.

See also
List of islands of Norway

References

Islands of Trøndelag
Villages in Trøndelag
Ørland